Blood-proteins, also termed plasma proteins, are proteins present in blood plasma. They serve many different functions, including transport of lipids, hormones, vitamins and minerals in  activity and functioning of the immune system. Other blood proteins act as enzymes, complement components, protease inhibitors or kinin precursors. Contrary to popular belief, haemoglobin is not a blood protein, as it is carried within red blood cells, rather than in the blood serum.

Serum albumin accounts for 55% of blood proteins, is a major contributor to maintaining the oncotic pressure of plasma and assists, as a carrier, in the transport of lipids and steroid hormones.  Globulins make up 38% of blood proteins and transport ions, hormones, and lipids assisting in immune function. Fibrinogen comprises 7% of blood proteins; conversion of fibrinogen to insoluble fibrin is essential for blood clotting. The remainder of the plasma proteins (1%) are regulatory proteins, such as enzymes, proenzymes, and hormones. All blood proteins are synthesized in liver except for the gamma globulins.

Families of blood proteins

Examples of specific blood proteins:
Prealbumin (transthyretin)
Alpha 1 antitrypsin (neutralizes trypsin that has leaked from the digestive system)
Alpha-1-acid glycoprotein
Alpha-1-fetoprotein
alpha2-macroglobulin
Gamma globulins
Beta-2 microglobulin
Haptoglobin
Ceruloplasmin
Complement component 3
Complement component 4
C-reactive protein (CRP)
Lipoproteins (chylomicrons, VLDL, LDL, HDL)
Transferrin
Prothrombin
MBL or MBP

Clinical significance 
Separating serum proteins by electrophoresis is a valuable diagnostic tool, as well as a way to monitor clinical progress. Current research regarding blood plasma proteins is centered on performing proteomics analyses of serum/plasma in the search for biomarkers. These efforts started with two-dimensional gel electrophoresis efforts in the 1970s, and in more recent times this research has been performed using LC-tandem MS based proteomics. The normal laboratory value of serum total protein is around 7 g/dL.

References

Clinical Chemistry : a laboratory perspective / [edited by] Wendy Arneson, Jean Brickell.

Blood proteins